The Scorpion and the Frog is an animal fable which teaches that vicious people cannot resist hurting others even when it is not in their own interests. This fable seems to have emerged in Russia in the early 20th century.

Synopsis
A scorpion wants to cross a river but cannot swim, so it asks a frog to carry it across. The frog hesitates, afraid that the scorpion might sting it, but the scorpion promises not to, pointing out that it would drown if it killed the frog in the middle of the river. The frog considers this argument sensible and agrees to transport the scorpion. Midway across the river, the scorpion stings the frog anyway, dooming them both. The dying frog asks the scorpion why it stung despite knowing the consequence, to which the scorpion replies: "I am sorry, but I couldn't resist the urge. It's in my nature."

Origins
The earliest known appearance of this fable is in the 1933 Russian novel, The German Quarter by Lev Nitoburg. The fable also appears in the 1944 novel, The Hunter of the Pamirs, and this is the earliest known appearance of the fable in English. The Hunter of the Pamirs is an English translation of the 1940 Russian novel, Jura by Georgii Tushkan, but the fable does not appear in the original Russian. The fable appears in the final chapter of The Hunter of the Pamirs, but does not appear at the corresponding location in Jura.

In the English-speaking world, the fable was made famous by the 1955 film Mr. Arkadin. It is recounted in a soliloquy by the movie's villain, played by Orson Welles. In an interview, Welles mentioned that the fable is Russian in origin.

Precursors

The Scorpion and the Turtle

A likely precursor to this fable is the Persian fable of The Scorpion and the Turtle. This earlier fable appears in the Anvaar Soheili, a collection of fables written c. 1500 by the Persian scholar Husayn Kashifi. The Anvaar Soheili contains fables translated from the Panchatantra, a collection of Indian fables written in Sanskrit, but The Scorpion and the Turtle does not appear in the Panchatantra, which suggests that the fable is Persian in origin.

In the Scorpion and the Turtle, it is a turtle that carries the scorpion across the river, and the turtle survives the scorpion's sting thanks to its protective shell. The turtle is baffled by the scorpion's behavior because they are old friends and the scorpion must have known that its stinger would not pierce the turtle's shell. The scorpion responds that it acted neither out of malice nor ingratitude, but merely an irresistible and indiscriminate urge to sting. The turtle then delivers the following reflection: "Truly have the sages said that to cherish a base character is to give one's honor to the wind, and to involve one's own self in embarrassment."

The moral of this fable is thus stated explicitly, and not left to interpretation. Another important difference is that the scorpion does not anticipate drowning. In some later versions of this fable, the turtle punishes the scorpion by drowning it anyway.

Aesop
The Scorpion and the Frog is sometimes attributed to Aesop as its true author is unknown, though it does not appear in any collection of Aesop's fables prior to the 20th century. However, there are a number of ancient fables traditionally attributed to Aesop which teach a similar moral, the closest parallels being The Farmer and the Viper and The Frog and the Mouse.

Interpretations
A common interpretation of this fable is that people with vicious personalities cannot resist hurting others even when it is not in their interests.

The Italian writer Giancarlo Livraghi has commented that while there are plenty of animal fables which warn against trusting vicious people, in none of these other fables is the villain irrationally self-destructive and fully aware of it.

To a social psychologist, the fable may present a dispositionist view of human nature because it seems to reject the idea that people behave rationally according to circumstances. The French sociologist Jean-Claude Passeron saw the scorpion as a metaphor for Machiavellian politicians who delude themselves by their unconscious tendency to rationalize their ill-conceived plans, and thereby lead themselves and their followers to ruin. The psychologist Kevin Dutton saw the scorpion as a metaphor for psychopaths, whose impulsive and vicious personalities frequently get them into unnecessary trouble, often hurting the people they depend on, such as their own families.

When the villain of the movie Mr. Arkadin recounts this fable, he uses the word "character" in lieu of "nature", and he concludes by saying "let's drink to character". For director Orson Welles, the word "character" had two meanings: it could mean one's natural instincts, but also how one chooses to behave. The scorpion couldn't resist its natural urge to sting, but it also chose to be honest about it to the frog. Orson Welles believed that this frankness gave the scorpion a certain charm and tragic dignity.

Other contexts
Since the fable's narration in Mr. Arkadin, it has been recounted in other films, such as Skin Deep (1989), The Crying Game (1992), Drive (2011), and The Devil's Carnival (2012). In addition, references to the fable have appeared in comics, television shows, and in newspaper articles, some of which have applied it to the relationship between big business and government and to politics, especially the bitter nature of Middle Eastern politics such as the Arab–Israeli conflict and in Iran.

Footnotes

Bibliography

 
An English translation of this interview is available on Wellesnet.com (May 22, 2006)

European folklore
Fables
Fictional arachnids
Fictional duos
Fictional frogs
Scorpions in popular culture